Erica cruenta is a species of Erica native to Cape Province, South Africa. It is an erect bush, 2–3 feet high with blood-red flowers.

References
 W. Aiton, Hort. kew. 2:16. 1789.
 Flora Capensis, H. Bolus, F. Guthrie and N. E. Brown, Vol 4, page 2, (1909).
 "Plants of southern Africa: names and distribution", Mem. Bot. Surv. S. Africa, no. 62, T. H. Arnold and B. C. De Wet, editors, 1993. 
 Jstor entry
 

cruenta
Plants described in 1789